This is a list of the largest megachurches in the United States with an attendance of more than 10,000 weekly, sometimes also termed a gigachurch. According to that The Hartford Institute's database, approximately 50 churches had attendance ranging from 10,000 to 47,000 in 2010. The same source also lists more than 1,300 such Protestant and Evangelical churches in the United States with a weekly attendance of more than 2,000, meeting the definition of a megachurch. 

As the term megachurch in common parlance refers to Protestant congregations; although there are some Roman Catholic parishes which would meet the criteria, they are not listed. St Ann's in Coppell, Texas, would be near the top, with almost 30,000 registered parishioners in 2013. St Matthew's Catholic Church in the Ballantyne neighborhood of Charlotte, North Carolina likewise has been described as a Catholic megachurch. with nearly 36,000 registered members in 2017 and 11 weekly masses. However weekly attendance figures may be lower than the number of registered parishioners, and the differences in way the churches operate and the way attendance is counted are given as reasons for not including Catholic churches in lists of megachurches.

Membership numbers of the following churches give only a very rough indication of size. They vary from year to year. Also, some churches report typical Sunday attendance while others report the number who are listed in church records or make financial contributions, which may be higher. Some of the larger churches are multi-site churches. Many churches deliver their message through television or other media, sometimes reaching much higher numbers than those who physically attend the church.

List 
Note that the attendance numbers are often provided by the church itself, and may be unreliable.

See also 
 List of the largest evangelical megachurches
 List of the largest evangelical church auditoriums
 List of largest church buildings in the world

Notes

References 

Megachurches
Megachurches, United States
Megachurches